Nemetsky Peninsula is a peninsula in the far north region of continental European Russia. Its name is translated as "German peninsula". The peninsula is connected to the continent by a thin isthmus; thus, the peninsula is nearly completely surrounded by water. Administratively, it is included into the Pechenga raion of Murmansk Oblast and is within several hours of ride from Murmansk.

History 
After the Russian Revolution, the Nemetsky Peninsula was ceded to Finland. The peninsula was passed to the Soviet Union after the Second World War in 1945.

References 

Peninsulas of Murmansk Oblast